Ham and eggs is a popular breakfast dish.

Ham and eggs may also refer to:

 Ham and Eggs, a 1933 Oswald the Lucky Rabbit cartoon
 "Ham and Eggs" (or "Ham an' Eggs"), a folk/blues song recorded by Lead Belly, Lonnie Donegan, and others
 "Ham and Eggs", a 2000 single by Zen Guerrilla
 Ham and Eggs at the Front, a 1927 silent comedy film
 Ham and egg bun, a type of Hong Kong pastry
 Ham and Eggs Movement, an old-age pension initiative in 1930s California
 Ham 'n' Eggs, a tavern in downtown Los Angeles

See also
 Green Eggs and Ham, a children's book by Dr. Seuss
 A variation of the dish Eggs Benedict in which ham is substituted for traditional bacon